Bernadette is a given name.

Bernadette may also refer to:
 Bernadette (singer) (born 1959), Dutch singer
 "Bernadette" (Four Tops song), 1967
 "Bernadette" (IAMX song), 2011

See also
 Bernadotte (disambiguation)
 Bernadetta